Dark World (1935) is a British film directed by Bernard Vorhaus and starring Tamara Desni, Leon Quartermaine, and Googie Withers. The film, released by Fox Film Corporation, is now considered a lost film.

Plot summary
A psychological drama concerning conflict between two brothers.

Cast
 Tamara Desni as Birgitta  
 Leon Quartermaine as Stephen  
 Hugh Brooke as Philip  
 Olga Lindo as Eleanor  
 Morton Selten as Colonel  
 Fred Duprez as Schwartz  
 Viola Compton as Auntie  
 Googie Withers as Annie  
 Kynaston Reeves as John

See also
List of lost films
BFI 75 Most Wanted (list of other lost films the BFI is searching for)

References

External links

1935 films
British black-and-white films
Lost British films
1930s English-language films
Films directed by Bernard Vorhaus
1930s British films